Grindelia obovatifolia is a North American species of flowering plants in the family Asteraceae. It is native to northeastern Mexico, found only the State of Nuevo León.

References

obovat
Endemic flora of Mexico
Flora of Nuevo León
Plants described in 1942